Bob Simms (born September 3, 1938) is a former professional American football player who played linebacker for three seasons for the New York Giants and Pittsburgh Steelers

References

1938 births
American football linebackers
New York Giants players
Pittsburgh Steelers players
Rutgers Scarlet Knights football players
Living people
People from Clendenin, West Virginia